Norm Benning Jr. (born January 16, 1952) is an American professional stock car racing driver and team owner. He competes part-time in the NASCAR Craftsman Truck Series, driving the No. 46 Toyota Tundra for G2G Racing. He has competed in the series since 2002, primarily driving for his team, Norm Benning Racing. He has also worked as a driver analyst for TheRacingExperts.com in the past.

Benning has often been referred to as Stormin' Norman after his performance in the 2013 Mudsummer Classic, the Truck Series' first race on dirt. He previously competed in the NASCAR Busch Series and Winston Cup Series.

Early career
Born in Level Green, Pennsylvania, Benning began by racing as a 15-year-old at Heidelberg Raceway even though he was supposed to be at least 18 years old. He also has raced in dirt late models and asphalt modifieds.

ARCA
Benning has finished in the top 10 in ARCA points seven times, with a highest of 5th in 2001. In 276 starts, Benning has five top 5 and 32 top 10 finishes. His best effort was a 3rd-place finish at the Springfield dirt mile in 2004.

NASCAR

1989–2012

Benning has attempted numerous NASCAR races in the top 3 divisions during his career. Benning made his NASCAR debut in 1989, driving in three races in the Cup Series for the No. 99 car owned by Jerry O'Neil. After starting 35th, Benning would finish 30th in his debut at Dover. He would then match that finish at Pocono and 31st in his return to Dover.

Benning made his last Cup points race start for O'Neil in 1993, starting last (39th) at Darlington and finishing 39th after one lap of competition. After that, Benning attempted to make the Daytona 500 for seven consecutive years, but either failed to qualify or was denied entry due to his car being slow in practice. He attempted many Cup races through 2001 in his own No. 84 84 Lumber Chevy, as well a couple of entries of the No. 79 T.R.I.X. Racing car. Benning attempted a total of 33 Cup races, but DNQ'd 29 times. He withdrew from the 2011 Daytona 500.

Benning's next NASCAR start came in the Craftsman Truck Series in 2002. Driving for Troxell Racing, Benning qualified the No. 93 Chevy into the field at Nashville Superspeedway in 18th position. A vibration dropped the team out of the event and Benning finished 32nd. In 2009 Benning was back in the Truck Series attempting a full season. He only missed one race and that was Daytona. At Michigan, Benning finished 17th his best finish of the year for the Camping World Truck Series. His final position in points was 21st.

Benning attempted the NASCAR Busch Series for the next two years. Benning was able to compete in 3 of the 6 races attempted. In his debut, Benning started the 2003 Nazareth race in 42nd and finished in 40th. He was later able to improve during the season with a career-best 36th place at NHIS. Driving once again at Nazareth, Benning started 42nd before brake failure forced him out of the race, finishing 38th. He fielded a car for Dion Ciccarelli at Nazareth in 2004, who finished 29th.

During the 2008 Truck Series season, Benning competed in 7 of the 8 races attempted driving his own No. 57 Chevrolet. In 2009, Benning competed full-time in the Truck Series for his team (his first attempt at a full NASCAR season). He qualified for 24 of 25 races and finished 21st in overall points. His best finish came at Michigan when he finished 17th with Germane Red sponsorship.

2013–2015
In 2013, Benning held onto fifth place after a hard-fought battle with Clay Greenfield in the "Last Chance" qualifying race at Eldora Speedway to earn the final transfer spot into the inaugural Mudsummer Classic. His truck sustained a fair amount of damage, but he was able to make repairs with the help of members of larger teams. He would go on to finish 26th, four laps down. Benning's performance in the last chance race was popular with fans; afterward he placed the Eldora truck for sale on eBay.
Later that season, Benning obtained his career-best Truck Series finish of 12th at Talladega Superspeedway. During the 2014 season, Benning changed from his iconic 57 to the number 6, with the 57 being the part-time second entry. Late in the season, Benning gained backing on behalf of Pennsylvania governor Tom Corbett. In 2015, Benning finished 14th in the opening race at Daytona and was 10th in points. Benning scored his best career start of 13th during the 2015 Mudsummer Classic and finished 19th after rebounding from a late-race spin. The end of the 2015 season was a struggle, as Benning missed four races late in the season.

2016–2018
2016 started with a DNQ at Daytona, followed by another DNQ at Atlanta. This was the worst start for Benning since 2012. Benning failed to qualify for six races in 2016; in addition to withdrawing from the Charlotte race. Benning missed the race in Texas by .016 seconds after getting knocked out by Austin Hill. After missing all the races in 2016, Benning partnered with MB Motorsports at Kentucky, where he was able to make the race, he started 30th and finished 28th. Benning later partnered with MB for several remaining races. 2016 was a struggle for Benning and his team, as he only managed to qualify for eight races while failing to qualify for eight others, and withdrawing from five. 2017 began the same for Benning, missing the first 3 races of the season. Benning would make the 4th race of the season in Kansas after only 32 trucks showed up for the 32-truck field. However, after that race, he made every single race he attempted for the rest of the season. In 2018, Benning made every race until the regular-season finale at Bristol. After Canada, he failed to make Las Vegas through Martinsville and didn't show up the rest of the season.

2019–present
2019 showed some promise at the beginning of the season, with sponsorship from Zomongo and H&H Transport returning. During drafting practice, Benning's No. 6 Silverado sat 6th fastest, showing the ability to stay in the pack. However, the team lacked single truck speed, and ultimately missed the field. Atlanta through Dover was hit and miss. An early spin forced Benning to park early despite plans to run the full race, resulting in a 29th-place finish. Benning finished under power in 28th at Las Vegas and then would miss Martinsville and Texas. Benning would qualify at Dover and Kansas but would be parked due to not being able to meet the minimum speed, finishing last at Dover after only 28 laps, and 21st at Kansas after 109 laps. Benning would skip Charlotte due to a large entry list. Over the next 4 weeks, things would begin to fall into place for Benning and his small team. The second Texas race would result in a 17th-place finish, followed by a 24th and 25th at Iowa and Gateway, respectively. The remainder of the season would have ups and downs, including an 18th place at Talladega, followed by an accident at Martinsville, that would ultimately end his season early.

2020 would begin the same as 2019, with Benning missing the cut at Daytona. Benning chose not to make the trip to Las Vegas and had no clear plans for the season. Following the 2-month racing hiatus, Benning looked to take advantage of NASCAR's field expansion, from 32 trucks to 40. However, Benning found himself excluded from the races at Charlotte and Atlanta when 47 trucks entered each time. The following race at Homestead, only 39 teams entered, allowing Benning to make his first start of the season. He made all other attempted races skipping the other Las Vegas race and the finale at Phoenix Raceway. Benning posted a best finish of 22nd at Talladega Superspeedway, and a points finish of 36th.

Benning would announce plans to attempt the full 2021 NASCAR Camping World Truck Series schedule. Shortly after, Benning would start a fundraising campaign called "Racing With The Ultimate Underdog". Benning would pick up sponsorship from MDF A Sign Company heading into Daytona, and, after several years of running a plain paint scheme, Benning would add red and yellow accent to his truck. Benning would just miss out on qualifying for the season-opening race, but by finishing in the top 40 in points in 2020, Benning would make the second race at the Daytona Road Course, thanks to NASCAR's no qualifying for the majority of the 2021 season. Benning would take advantage of Camping World CEO Marcus Lemonis' offer of $15,000 to any team who ran at Las Vegas and Atlanta with Camping World and Overton's paint schemes. After lackluster results most of the season, Benning was able to score a top 20 finish at Knoxville despite being involved in a late accident. At Gateway, Benning was notified by officials that his truck's nose was no longer legal, forcing him to withdraw. Benning would show at the second Darlington race with a new nose. Benning would score another top 20, a 17th, at Talladega, with new sponsorship from Cross-Eyed Owl Brewing. For the season finale race, Benning was able to get a Niece Motorsports prepared truck, along with an Ilmor engine. However, problems before qualifying plagued the 6 team, and Benning turned the slowest lap, resulting in a DNQ. Benning did say he and his team would be back in 2022. Prior to the start of the 2022 season, NASCAR introduced an updated body style for the Truck Series, starting at Daytona. The 2019-2021 bodies would still be legal at all tracks except Daytona and Talladega. Benning, unable to afford the new body, would skip the season opener at Daytona, the first time he had done so since 2008. Benning and team would not appear until the second annual Bristol Dirt Race, bringing sponsorship Circle B Diecasts aboard. Benning would fall short in his heat race, leaving him as one of the two DNQ's. Despite the setback, Circle B agreed to return to the team for Knoxville, which again, Benning missed. Driver and team's next attempt would come at Pocono Raceway, but rain washed out qualifying, again leaving the 6 on the outside looking in. Missing Pocono would also break the threeway tie between Benning, Matt Crafton and Johnny Sauter for most starts at Pocono. Benning would make one last attempt at Richmond, again falling short of qualifying.

On February 14, 2023, it was revealed that Benning would attempt to qualify for the race at Daytona driving the No. 46 Toyota for G2G Racing, replacing Johnny Sauter, who was originally on the entry list for the event.

Motorsports career results

NASCAR
(key) (Bold – Pole position awarded by time. Italics – Pole position earned by points standings. * – Most laps led.)

Sprint Cup Series

Daytona 500

Busch Series

Craftsman Truck Series

 Season still in progress
 Ineligible for series points

ARCA Re/Max Series
(key) (Bold – Pole position awarded by qualifying time. Italics – Pole position earned by points standings or practice time. * – Most laps led.)

References

External links
 
 
 

Living people
1952 births
People from Westmoreland County, Pennsylvania
Racing drivers from Pennsylvania
NASCAR drivers
NASCAR team owners
ARCA Menards Series drivers
Sportspeople from the Pittsburgh metropolitan area